BlueScope Steel Limited is an Australian flat product steel producer that was spun-off from BHP Billiton in 2002.

History
BlueScope was formed when BHP Billiton spun-off its steel assets on 15 July 2002 as BHP Steel. It was renamed BlueScope on 17 November 2003.

Early in 2004, BlueScope merged with the American firm Butler Manufacturing. Such a merger was considered a strategic move for both companies as they were similar in character and non-overlapping in the markets they operated in, such that acquisition of Butler, based in Kansas City, Missouri, would provide BlueScope with access to United States and Chinese markets. Butler was founded in 1901, operated in sixteen countries and focused on non-residential building and building component construction. At the time of the merger, Butler had a dozen production facilities across the United States, China and Mexico.

In 2007, the company acquired four companies consisting of most of the United States holdings of the Argentinian firm Ternium, those being Steelscape, ASC Profiles, Varco Pruden Buildings; and Metl-Span, which was acquired by NCI Building Systems in 2012. The four companies had been held by the Mexican Grupo IMSA prior to their purchase by Ternium. Steelscape originated in 1996 as BHP Coated Steel and was originally owned by BlueScope.

In March 2012 a new coated steel manufacturing plant was inaugurated in Jamshedpur, India.

In February 2014, BlueScope purchased Orrcon Steel from Hills. Its products included RHS, SHS and CHS structural tubular steel, hot-rolled structural steel and fencing, roofing and building accessories.

Because of lower energy prices in the United States than in Australia, BlueScope in 2019 decided to expand its investment in America by $1 billion.

Operations

The corporate headquarters are located at 120 Collins Street, Melbourne.

The company has 16,000 personnel. Its largest operating plant, an integrated steelworks, is located at Port Kembla, New South Wales. In October 2011, No.6 Blast furnace, one of two at Port Kembla, was shut down, reducing the plant's production capacity by 50% after the company decided to exit the export market.

Major products include steel slab, hot rolled coil, steel plate, automotive steel, galvanised steel, corrugated galvanised iron, Zincalume brand (55% aluminium, 43.5% zinc, 1.5% silicon) coated steel, and Colorbond brand pre-painted steel. Tinplate production ceased in March 2007.

Orrcon Steel supplies steel, tube and pipe to steel fabricators, furniture and trailer body manufacturers, housing and construction companies and pipeline and infrastructure engineering firms.

It has distribution centres in Melbourne, Sydney, Brisbane, Perth and Adelaide.

Carbon footprint
BlueScope reported Total CO2e emissions (Direct + Indirect) for the twelve months ending 30 June 2020 at 10,280 Kt (-120 /-1.2% y-o-y).

Controversy
In August 2019, the Australian Competition & Consumer Commission launched a civil case against BlueScope and a former executive for engaging in cartel conduct, alleging that they tried to induce competitors to enter contracts to fix prices for flat steel products between 2013 and 2014. BlueScope denied the allegations, stating "we do not believe that BlueScope, or any current or former employees, have engaged in cartel conduct". In December 2020, the former executive was sentenced to eight months imprisonment and fined $10,000 after pleading guilty to obstructing the investigation, inciting two employees to give false information.

On 6 May 2020, a 59-year-old man was killed at BlueScope's Port Kembla facility after becoming trapped between a car and a crane, resulting in the site being temporarily shut.

On 14 May 2020, BlueScope was the subject of a cyberattack that forced its production systems to be temporarily halted company-wide after ransomware was discovered in one of its systems.

In July 2020, BlueScope was fined $30,000 by the New South Wales Environment Protection Authority for failing to comply with dioxin air emission limits on six occasions between March and April 2020. In response, BlueScope completed air emissions modelling and engaged an independent consultant to undertake a health assessment of the elevated emissions.

Major manufacturing facilities 
 Port Kembla, New South Wales
 Western Port in Hastings, Victoria
 New Zealand Steel, Glenbrook
 Orrcon Brisbane Mill, Salisbury, Queensland
 Orrcon Precision Tubing Mill, Adelaide, South Australia

Finished products are transported around Australia by rail freight operator Pacific National. In February 2007 Pacific National secured Australia's largest ever rail freight contract ($1 billion) with BlueScope Steel and OneSteel, to carry approximately three million tonnes of steel product each year for seven years. The contract was renewed for a further seven years from January 2015. In January 2022, Qube Holdings and SCT Logistics will take over from Pacific National.

References

External links
Company website

BHP
Companies based in Melbourne
Companies listed on the Australian Securities Exchange
Multinational companies headquartered in Australia
Manufacturing companies established in 2002
Steel companies of Australia
2002 establishments in Australia